EXN may refer to:

 Exin (ICAO airline code: EXN) a Polish airline
 Exton railway station (rail station code: EXN) in England
 Discovery Channel Canada, formerly also using "EXN.net" in the 2000s
 Excellon Resources Inc. (TSE stock ticker: EXN), see Companies listed on the Toronto Stock Exchange (E)